Aurantiporus fissilis is a species of poroid fungus in the family Polyporaceae. It is a plant pathogen. Although known primarily as a central and northern European species, it was recorded from Taiwan in 2016. It is inedible.

References

Fungi described in 1849
Fungi of Asia
Fungi of Europe
Fungal plant pathogens and diseases
Inedible fungi
Polyporaceae
Taxa named by Miles Joseph Berkeley